Wyatt Earp was an Old West lawman.

Wyatt Earp may also refer to:

Ships
 , an Australian survey vessel
 , a Royal Australian Navy vessel
 , a World War II American cargo ship

Media
 Wyatt Earp (card game), a rummy-like card game
 Wyatt Earp (film) (1994), an American film
 Wyatt Earp: Frontier Marshal, a biography of Wyatt Earp
 Wyatt Earp comic book series published by Atlas Comics (1955–60)

See also
 The Life and Legend of Wyatt Earp
 Wyatt ERP
 Wyatt Earp's Revenge